This is a list of animated feature films that were released in 2021.

Highest-grossing animated films
The following is a list of the 10 highest-grossing animated feature films first released in 2021.

Notes

References

2021
2021 animated films
2021-related lists